Carlo Scarpa (2 June 1906 – 28 November 1978) was an Italian architect, influenced by the materials, landscape and the history of Venetian culture, and by Japan. Scarpa translated his interests in history, regionalism, invention, and the techniques of the artist and craftsman into ingenious glass and furniture design.

Biography 
Scarpa was born in Venice. Much of his early childhood was spent in Vicenza, where his family relocated when he was 2 years old. After his mother's death when he was 13, he moved with his father and brother back to Venice. Carlo attended the Academy of Fine Arts where he focused on architectural studies. Graduated from the Accademia in Venice, with the title of Professor of Architecture, he apprenticed with the architect Francesco Rinaldo. Scarpa married Rinaldo's niece, Nini Lazzari (Onorina Lazzari).

However, Scarpa refused to sit the pro forma professional exam administrated by the Italian Government after World War II. As a consequence, he was not permitted to practice architecture without associating with an architect. Hence, those who worked with him, his clients, associates, craftspersons, called him "Professor", rather than "architect".

His architecture is deeply sensitive to the changes of time, from seasons to history, rooted in a sensuous material imagination. He was Mario Botta's thesis adviser along with Giuseppe Mazzariol; the latter was the Director of the Fondazione Querini Stampalia when Scarpa completed his renovation and garden for that institution. Scarpa taught drawing and Interior Decoration at the "Istituto universitario di architettura di Venezia" from the late 1940s until his death. While most of his built work is located in the Veneto, he made designs of landscapes, gardens, and buildings, for other regions of Italy as well as Canada, the United States, Saudi Arabia, France and Switzerland. His name has 11 letters and this is used repeatedly in his architecture.

One of his last projects, the Villa Palazzetto in Monselice, left incomplete at the time of his death, was altered in October 2006 by his son Tobia. This work is one of Scarpa's most ambitious landscape and garden projects, the Brion Sanctuary notwithstanding. It was executed for Aldo Businaro, the representative for Cassina who is responsible for Scarpa's first trip to Japan. Aldo Businaro died in August 2006, a few months before the completion of the new stair at the Villa Palazzetto, built to commemorate Scarpa's centenary.

In 1978, while in Sendai, Japan, Scarpa died after falling down a flight of concrete stairs. He survived for ten days in a hospital before succumbing to the injuries of his fall. He is buried standing up and wrapped in linen sheets in the style of a medieval knight, in an isolated exterior corner of his L-shaped Brion Cemetery at San Vito d'Altivole in the Veneto.

In 1984, the Italian composer Luigi Nono dedicated to him the composition for orchestra in micro-intervals A Carlo Scarpa, Architetto, Ai suoi infiniti possibili.

Notable works
Gallerie dell'Accademia, Venice, Italy
 Padiglione del libro d'arte, Giardini di Castello, La Biennale, Venice, 1950–1952  
 Palazzo Abatellis: La Galleria Di Sicilia, Palermo, 1953–1954 
Palazzo Ca'Foscari, Venice, Italy, 1935–1956
 Venezuelan Pavilion, La Biennale, Venice, Italy, 1954–1956
 Veritti House, Udine, Italy, 1955–1961 
 Museo Canova di Possagno, Italy, 1955–1957 
Museo di Castelvecchio, Verona, Italy, 1956–1964 
 Negozio Olivetti, piazza S. Marco, Venezia, Italy, 1957–1958 
Fondazione Querini Stampalia, Venice, 1961–1963 
Brion Tomb and Sanctuary, at San Vito d'Altivole, Italy, 1969–1978 
Banca Popolare di Verona, Italy, 1973–1978 
Restauración del Museo de Castelvecchio en Verona / Carlo Scarpa

Carlo Scarpa Designer 
Carlo Scarpa was a designer too. At the beginning of his career, he collaborated with glassmakers in Murano. He designed jars and chandeliers for MVM Cappellin & Co. and Venini.

Furthermore, he joined the industrial design world in the 1960s after meeting Dino Gavina. Indeed Scarpa became the president of the eponymous company Gavina.

In 1968, after the founding of Studio Simon, Carlo Scarpa started to design industrial furniture.

He projected pieces for Simon and Bernini.

The Doge table (1968) and the Cornaro sofa (1973) are the most famous.

Bibliography
 Francesco Dal Co; Giuseppe Mazzariol (1984). Carlo Scarpa: opera completa. Milan: Electa.
 Francesco Dal Co; Giuseppe Mazzariol (1985). Carlo Scarpa: The Complete Works. Milan: Electa; New York: Rizzoli.
 Maria Antonietta Crippa, edited by Marina Loffi Randolin. (1986). Carlo Scarpa: Theory, Design, Projects. Cambridge, Massachusetts: MIT Press.
 Nicholas Olsberg, et al. (1999). Carlo Scarpa, Architect: Intervening with History. Montréal, Quebec: Canadian Centre for Architecture; New York: The Monacelli Press.
 Sergio Los (1967). Carlo Scarpa: architetto poeta. London: RIBA.
 Sergio Los (1995). Carlo Scarpa: guida all’architettura. Venice: Arsenale.
 Carla Sonego (1995). Carlo Scarpa. Gli anni della formazione. Venice: IUAV, (unpublished thesis, Professor Marco De Michelis, supervisor).
Anne-Catrin Schultz (2007). Carlo Scarpa: Layers. Stuttgart: Edition Axel Menges.
Guido Beltramini, Italo Zannier (2007). Carlo Scarpa: Architecture and Design. New York: Rizzoli.
Sergio Los (2009). Carlo Scarpa: 1906-1978: A Poet of Architecture. Köln: Taschen.
Francesco Dal Co (2009). To Construct, to Compose: Carlo Scarpa and the Villa Ottolenghi. Amsterdam: SUN.
Guido Guidi (2011). Carlo Scarpa's Tomba Brion. Ostfildern: Hatje Cantz.
 Franca Semi (2010). A lezione con Carlo Scarpa. Venice: Cicero.
 Robert McCarter (2013). Carlo Scarpa. London: Phaidon Press. (2nd edition 2017)
Giunta, Santo (2020), Carlo Scarpa. A [curious] shaft of light, a golden standard, the hands and a face of a woman. Reflections on the design process and layout of Palazzo Abatellis 1953-1954. Foreword by Richard Murphy; Afterword by Giampiero Bosoni, Marsilio, Venice, .

References

Giunta, Santo (2020), Carlo Scarpa. A [curious] shaft of light, a golden standard, the hands and a face of a woman. Reflections on the design process and layout of Palazzo Abatellis 1953-1954. Foreword by Richard Murphy; Afterword by Giampiero Bosoni, Marsilio, Venice, .

External links

 Digital Archive of Carlo Scarpa
 

1906 births
1978 deaths
Accidental deaths in Japan
Architects from Venice
Accidental deaths from falls
Italian designers
Modernist architects from Italy
20th-century Italian architects
Olivetti people